Yale College, Wrexham (Coleg Iâl) is now part of Coleg Cambria.

Formerly a further education college situated in Wrexham, North Wales, Yale College, Wrexham merged with Deeside College in August 2013 to create Coleg Cambria, the college for North East Wales, one of the largest UK colleges. Coleg Cambria is a Young Adult community for people aged 16 years and older.

Coleg Cambria consists of six campuses including Deeside, Yale Grove Park, Yale Bersham Road, Llysfasi, Northop and Wrexham Training.  The college offers a wide range of courses from Further Education to HNC’s and Foundation Degrees for full and part-time students, apprentices and part-time community learners.

History
The history of Yale College can be summarised in four phases: Yale Grammar and Technical School, Yale High School from 1965, Yale Sixth Form, Yale College and now part of Coleg Cambria. It was founded in 1950 as a state school on a site at Crispin Lane as Wrexham Technical Grammar School and in 1965, when a brand new building was erected, it became Yale High School, named after Elihu Yale, best known for being the prime benefactor of Yale University, and whose family name derives from the nearby Welsh commote of Iâl. He is buried in Wrexham Parish Churchyard. In 1972, as part of the conversion of local schools to the comprehensive system, it was renamed as Yale Sixth Form College and the pupils re-located to other schools. The Crispin Lane site was incorporated into NEWI (now Glyndŵr University) after the development of the Grove Park Campus.

In 1995, work began on Yale's new campus which consisted of a mix of older and very modern, airy buildings in Wrexham city centre. Prior to dereliction, some of the buildings on the campus previously hosted Wrexham & East Denbighshire War Memorial Hospital up until the late 1980s, and another dating back to 1902 was previously Grove Park Grammar School, which again closed in the 1980s. Out of the many buildings on the site, two of the largest were selected for refurbishment, and along with the newer buildings, the campus finally opened in 1998, known as the Grove Park campus which handles various qualifications including GCSEs, National Diplomas and A levels.

In 1999, Yale University sued Wrexham County Borough Council over the use of the name Yale College (which had been the name of Yale University's undergraduate college for 225 years before Yale Wrexham was founded).  As a result of the settlement of the trademark infringement suit, the Yale College in Wales must always be legally referred to as Yale College in Wrexham or Yale College Wrexham. The name of the College in Welsh is Coleg Iâl Wrecsam.

In November 2008 Yale College was announced as the overall winner of the Wales quality Award, in which organisations from across Wales compete for each year.
2008 was also the year the College achieved the highest workplace based learning inspection results in Wales, with eleven grade ones.

The Yale College Grove Park Campus comprised eight buildings, five named after rivers in North Wales: Alun, Brenig, Clywedog, Dyfrdwy and Elwy, referred to as A, B, C, D and E Blocks. 
The shell of the Memorial Hospital houses Art and Multi-Media departments, as well as Yale College's own Gallery (hosting visiting artists), and the Regional Print Centre. 
This was known as MAB (Memorial Arts Building) or more simply, M Block.

The old Grove Park school as G Block. There was a two story Foodcourt, housing Café Iâl (the College Refectory), a "Lifestyle Bar" (Café) for staff and students, a Student Café, Common Room
and the studio of Radio Yale.

The second campus at Bersham Road, Wrexham , which handles the vocational courses, such as engineering,  plumbing and bricklaying; this recently underwent an extensive redevelopment. Up until 2006, the college also possessed additional capacity in Roxburgh House, Wrexham, however the majority of the building was handed back to the vendor due to lease expiration. Previously the building handled apprenticeships and training.

References

External links
 Coleg Cambria
 Coleg Cambria Facebook
 Coleg Cambria Twitter
 Coleg Cambria YouTube Channel

Wrexham
Further education colleges in Wrexham
1950 establishments in Wales
Educational institutions established in 1950